Dauzat may refer to
Albert Dauzat (1877–1955), French linguist 
Dylan Dauzat (born 1997), American actor, producer and YouTuber 
Dauzat-sur-Vodable, a commune in central France

See also 
 Adrien Dauzats, French painter